The Federal Palace Hotel is a 5 star hotel with 150-rooms that overlooks the Atlantic Ocean, located in the commercial hub of Victoria Island in Lagos. Established in 1960 as the country's premier international hotel, it was originally owned by the Victoria Beach Hotel, as part of the A. G. Leventis trading group. Considered "a landmark of the Lagos metropolis", the hotel is notable for having been the setting for the signing of Nigeria's Declaration of Independence. It has been a Sun International property since 2007.

History 
The Federal Palace Hotel is owned by Sun International. Sun International – best known for its Sun City Resort in the North West Province, Rustenburg – traces its roots back to 1969, when the Southern Sun Hotel Company was created with South African Breweries and Sol Kerzner joining forces.

When Nigeria gained its independence from Britain in 1960, it was in the main boardroom of the newly constructed Federal Palace Hotel that Nigeria's independence declaration was signed. This boardroom is now one of the main features of the hotel's casino. The official celebration of Nigeria's independence took place in the hotel's Independence Hall, which, also in 1977, hosted the summit of Heads of State of the African Union (formerly Organisation of Africa Unity) and the Festival of African Arts and Culture (FESTAC).

See also
 List of hotels in Lagos

References

External links
Sun International website

Hotels in Lagos
Hotels established in 1960
Victoria Island, Lagos
Hotel buildings completed in 1960
Landmarks in Lagos
1960 establishments in Nigeria
20th-century architecture in Nigeria